Kogi Central Senatorial District covers 5 local government areas which include, Adavi, Ajaokuta, Okehi, Okene,  and Ogori-Mangogo. The current representative is senator Yakubu Oseni.

List of members representing the district

References 

Kogi State
Senatorial districts in Nigeria